Field house or fieldhouse is an American English term for an indoor sports arena or stadium, mostly used for college basketball, volleyball, or ice hockey, or a support building for various adjacent sports fields, e.g. locker room, team room, coaches' offices, etc. The dates from the 1890s.

Notable field houses include:

United States

Alaska
Baker Field House, Eielson Air Force Base

Arkansas
Rhodes Fieldhouse, Harding University

California
Firestone Fieldhouse, Pepperdine University
Field House, California State University Dominguez Hills

Colorado
Balch Fieldhouse, University of Colorado
Cadet Field House, United States Air Force Academy
Cougar Field House, Colorado Christian University
Steinhauer Field House, Colorado School of Mines

Connecticut
Hugh S. Greer Field House, University of Connecticut

Delaware
Chase Fieldhouse, Delaware Blue Coats
Delaware Field House, University of Delaware

District of Columbia 
 Yates Field House, Georgetown University

Florida 
Enyart-Alumni Field House, Rollins College

Georgia
Hanner Fieldhouse, Georgia Southern University

Illinois
Chick Evans Field House, Northern Illinois University
Henry Crown Field House, University of Chicago
Horton Fieldhouse, Illinois State University
Robertson Memorial Field House, Bradley University
Wharton Field House, Tri-Cities Blackhawks

Indiana

Gainbridge Fieldhouse, Indiana Pacers and Indiana Fever
Gladstein Fieldhouse, Indiana University
Hinkle Fieldhouse, Butler University
Lambert Fieldhouse, Purdue University
New Castle Fieldhouse, New Castle High School
Notre Dame Fieldhouse, University of Notre Dame

Iowa
Iowa Fieldhouse, University of Iowa

Kansas
Ahearn Field House, Kansas State University
Allen Fieldhouse, University of Kansas

Louisiana
Devlin Fieldhouse, Tulane University
Huey P. Long Field House, Louisiana State University
Loyola Field House, New Orleans Jazz

Maryland
Cole Field House, University of Maryland
Halsey Field House, United States Naval Academy
Hill Field House, Morgan State University
Novak Field House, Prince George's Community College

Michigan
Al Glick Field House. University of Michigan
Bowen Field House, Eastern Michigan University
Ford Fieldhouse, Grand Rapids Community College
GVSU Fieldhouse, Grand Valley State University
Hedgcock Fieldhouse, Northern Michigan University
Jenison Fieldhouse, Michigan State University
Oosterbaan Field House, University of Michigan

Minnesota
John S. Glas Field House, Bemidji State University

Nebraska
Sapp Fieldhouse, University of Nebraska at Omaha

New York
Houston Field House, Rensselaer Polytechnic Institute
Manley Field House, Syracuse University
McCann Field House, Marist College

Ohio
Armory Fieldhouse, University of Cincinnati
The Field House, University of Toledo
Finnegan Fieldhouse, Franciscan University of Steubenville
Rocket Mortgage FieldHouse, Cleveland Cavaliers
Schmidt Field House, Xavier University

Oklahoma
Frederickson Fieldhouse, Oklahoma City University
Hamilton Field House, University of Central Oklahoma
McCasland Field House, University of Oklahoma

Oregon
Cone Fieldhouse, Willamette University
McAlexander Fieldhouse, Oregon State University

Pennsylvania
Alumni Memorial Fieldhouse, Saint Joseph's University
Erie County Field House, American Hockey League
Fitzgerald Field House, University of Pittsburgh
 Hamburg Field House, Hamburg
Jake Nevin Field House, Villanova University

South Carolina
Carolina Fieldhouse, University of South Carolina
CSU Field House, Charleston Southern University
Davis Field House, Bob Jones University
McAlister Field House, The Citadel

Tennessee
Elma Roane Fieldhouse, University of Memphis

Texas
Texas A&M-Commerce Field House, Texas A&M University–Commerce
UTPA Fieldhouse, University of Texas-Pan American

Utah
Smith Fieldhouse, Brigham Young University

Vermont
Gutterson Fieldhouse, University of Vermont

Virginia
Old Dominion University Fieldhouse, Old Dominion University

West Virginia
Veterans Memorial Fieldhouse, Marshall University

Wisconsin
University of Wisconsin Field House, University of Wisconsin–Madison

Canada

Alberta
Duvernay Fieldhouse, Okotoks Dawgs

Nova Scotia
Dalplex Fieldhouse, Dalhousie University

Ontario
Proctor Field House, Glendon College

C.J. Sanders Field House, Lakehead University

References 

Sports venues